Zhang Jinfu may refer to:

Zhang Jingfu (1914–2015), Chinese politician
Chang Jin-fu (born 1948), Taiwanese politician